Dark December is a board wargame designed by Danny S. Parker and published by Operational Studies Group in 1979. It is a multi-scenario tactical simulation of the Allied offensive during the Battle of the Bulge.

Gameplay
Dark December is played on a hex map, with each hex representing 3 kilometres. In a two-player game, one player controls the Allied forces and the other controls the German forces. Each side is given units that are either motorized or infantry, which have different uses and limitations. The length of the game, the number of starting forces, and the victory condition all depend on the scenario being played.

Players take turns going through the play phases, starting with the German player, with each turn representing twelve hours of in-game time. At the start of each turn, the German player rolls a die and consults a Fuel Shortage Table to determine which of their units have run dry, and the Allied player chooses one division to be out of supply at the start of each turn. The "phasing" player (player whose turn it is) can spend Movement Points (MPs) to bring troops out of reserve and move units at the speed designated by their type. The non-phasing player can then make a reaction to move out troops in their reserve.

The phasing player may attack enemy units occupying adjacent hexes, rolling two dice and finding the corresponding ratio on the Combat Results Table (CRT); this value can be affected by low supplies. Terrain in which a unit is located determines whether it suffers from a particular combat result such as mandatory losses, firefights, or counterattacks. It also determines the MP cost for movement, with units moving faster on unoccupied roads. Additionally, players can demolish or construct bridges across rivers.

Weather changes depend on the day of the campaign and can cause an increased MP cost for movement. There are a number of optional mechanics players can choose whether to implement, including surrender, disengagement, and fog.

Reviews
In a review for issue 78 of Games & Puzzles magazine, Nicky Palmer criticized the game's "unattractive" graphics, but also stated that the "generosity in supplementary material material does add to the pleasure of play." Eric Goldberg reviewed the game in issue 48 of Moves magazine, concluding that "if we assume that conflict simulations give insight into history, Dark December gives the best overview of the [Battle of the Bulge]."

References 

Operational Studies Group games
Wargames introduced in 1979